Haunted – 3D is a 2011 Indian supernatural action horror film directed by Vikram Bhatt and starring Mahaakshay Chakraborty, Tia Bajpai, Achint Kaur and Arif Zakaria. It is the first Indian stereoscopic 3D horror film.

The promos and first look of the film were released on 7 February 2011. The film was released on 6 May 2011 to mixed reviews but became a commercial success. The 3D Blu-ray was released on 3 August 2011.

Plot

Rehan travels to Koti, Shimla, to prepare a mansion Glen Manor for sale for his father's real estate company. He learns that the mansion's caretaker died two days ago from a heart attack due to the house being haunted. Although he refuses to believe this at first, he meets a rag picker telling him that only he will be able to stop the haunting.

Mysterious things happen over the next few nights, exactly at 3:00 am. Rehan saves himself from a few fatal attacks, hears repeated screams of a woman, sees a girl singing and playing the piano who vanishes when he opens the door; a book drops from a bookshelf on its own and Rehan finds a letter inside. The suicide letter, written by Meera Sabharwal to her parents, tells her story from 1936 when they left for Delhi to attend her brother's wedding and left her behind with her nanny Margaret, a servant and a driver, so that she could prepare for her upcoming exams. In their absence, her piano teacher Iyer tried to rape her during her lessons. However, she saved herself by hitting him hard with a candle stand on his head, which resulted in his death. Soon, the police corroborated Meera's story, as they found a few personal items and explicit sketches of hers drawn by Iyer in his house. However, Iyer, obsessed with Meera, returned in the form of an evil spirit, killing her servant first, then her driver and last of all, Margaret, leaving her all alone in the mansion. He raped Meera repeatedly for the next six days, who ended up committing suicide in despair. Rehan soon realizes that even after her death, her spirit is trapped and tortured inside the mansion by Iyer's spirit to this day.

After reading the letter, he feels sympathetic and brings a psychic, Mrs. Stevens to help, but the woman leaves after realising how much evil and obsessive Iyer's spirit is and asks Rehan to do the same, but he ignores her warning and stays there, challenging Iyer by repeating his name (as it is believed that saying an evil spirit's name makes it more powerful). However, Iyer's spirit appears before him, warning him to get out of the mansion and violently throws him out. Rehan tries to get in again, hearing the screams, but Meera's spirit appears before him too, saying that Iyer will never let him free her from his captivity. A tearful Rehan steps back and kneels down in despair before the thundering mansion, echoing with Meera's screams.

The next morning when he wakes up, he finds the rag-picker in front of him, casting a spell. The spell sends him back 75 years to 17 August 1936, the day when Meera's parents leave for Delhi. Rehan befriends Meera by being shown the way to the city by her, calling himself to be a lost newcomer to the town. The next day, in order to prevent Iyer's death, Rehan arrives at Glen Manor with a basket full of chocolates for Meera as a gift for showing him the way to the city, seconds before Iyer could carry out his intention. Rehan says that he would like to listen to Meera's performance as he is also interested in music, but Iyer asks him to leave. Rehan insists on staying outside the door so he will not interfere in their class and can still listen to her music (so that he could come to Meera's help if Iyer tries to assault her). As Rehan waits outside the room, Iyer unexpectedly hits him with a stick on the head, throwing him out on the lawn. He bolts the door from inside and tries to assault a horrified Meera. Injured and bleeding, Rehan staggers his way to the door. But, as written in fate, before he could do anything, Meera kills Iyer. A distraught Rehan is admitted to the hospital by Margaret and Meera, where he dreams about Iyer's spirit, saying that he knows he is from the future, his real motive for being there, and says that he will not let him succeed.

Rehan wakes up from the dream the next morning and rushes out of the hospital to save Meera's servant, who, according to her letter, was going to get killed. He is horrified along with Meera, Margaret and the driver when he finds the servant to be dead already. Desperate for her cooperation to help her out, he explains everything to Meera and Margaret and asks them to meet him the next day at noon. The next day, the three of them visit a priest, who tells them that far from the town is a Dargah, a mosque where there is a Sufi Baba who could help them. He tells them to start the journey at 3:00 pm because spirits are weakest at this point of time and they would be safe from Iyer but warns them about the time of 3:00 am, because at this time, all spirits are at their strongest. As it gets dark, the three decide to stay in a hotel. At night, Iyer's spirit possesses Margaret's body through a telephone call and tries to rape Meera again. Rehan fights it and takes Meera straight to the Dargah.

Meera, concerned about Rehan's safety, tries to leave him without caring for herself and calling herself the cause of the whole problem, but Rehan convinces her to let him help by professing his love for her. Both of them share a kiss. Meanwhile, the priest, who was praying for Meera is killed by a snake, who was probably Iyer's spirit. Margaret, still possessed, is present in the forest through which Rehan and Meera are going to the Dargah. She follows and attacks them, but Rehan stabs her in the abdomen with a sharp wood log. Assuming her to be dead, they both bury Margaret's body under some heavy logs. However, she rises from beneath the logs and chases both of them by flying in the air. Margaret kicks Rehan in the head and takes Meera with her in the air (as Iyer wants Meera), but Rehan realises that in the process of escaping, they have reached the Dargah.

Rehan grabs Margaret's foot just as she was about to fly off with Meera, and manages to put it at the doorstep of the Dargah, thereby forcing Iyer's spirit to leave through the hole in Margaret's abdomen and throwing off her dead body. Inside they find the same rag-picker who sent Rehan into the past, revealing himself to be the Sufi baba.

He tells them that a mile away is a town that was blessed by Khwaja, where there is a well which makes anything reach its place where it belongs to, and in which Meera has to show the way to the spirit, which is connected to her through his blood stained on her pendant when she killed him. As they reach the town, they have to drop the fire, soil, and the pendant (as the well works along with the five elements, water and air, being already available). As Meera is performing the act with Rehan by her side, both are interrupted by Iyer's spirit, but Rehan manages to throw the pendant into the well at the last moment, and the spirit is dragged into it. Thus, saving Meera, Rehan accidentally falls into the well too, as was in store for him, and reaches back to the year 2011. He finds another letter written by Meera to him in the same place, thanking him for gifting her a new life and saying that she was distraught at first for losing him forever, but then decided to live a happy life, in order to give importance to the invaluable gift bestowed upon her. A teary-eyed and happy Rehan looks at a smiling Meera in the photo frames on the wall with her family, husband and her child (named after him) and sits on the bed with her letter in hand, realising that Glen Manor is no longer haunted.

Cast

Reception

Critical response
Upon release, the film opened to mixed critical reviews. The Times of India while giving it three stars out of five stated "if the film works -- and it works quite well -- is only because of the special effects of the film. Experiencing the horror in 3D is indeed a novel experience for the viewer, specially since it is smartly done." Taran Adarsh of Bollywood Hungama gave it three and a half stars and concluded that "Haunted is for today's movie savvy audience. It succeeds in keeping you tense and edgy, as a true poltergeist/horror flick should. There are scenes and situations aplenty to shock and astound the viewer coupled with the 3D effects, the prosthetics, the background score, an absorbing screenplay and deft handling of the subject material." Shubhra Gupta of the Indian Express rated it with two stars saying that "the only new thing about 'Haunted' is that it is Bollywood horror in 3 D. The rest of it, by which we mean the principal stuff that makes it a film—story, location, characters—are all same old same old." Anupama Chopra of NDTV Movies awarded the film one and a half stars describing it as "an absolutely ridiculous horror movie that works better as comedy, unintentional of course." Preeti Arora of Rediff also gave it one and a half stars saying that "Haunted fails at reviving the age old haunted-house premise, bringing nothing new to the platter."

Box office
According to boxofficeindia.com, Haunted – 3D recorded the highest opening ever for an Indian horror film. Released with over 1044 prints, the film grossed  130 million during its opening weekend. By the end of its first week, the film grossed  143.0 million. In the second weekend, the film experienced a drop of 55% from its first weekend collections, grossing  3.50 crore for a ten-day total of  180 million. After four weeks, the film grossed  262.5 million in India, and  350 million worldwide. It was declared a Hit by Boxoffice-india.

Soundtrack
The music is composed by Chirantan Bhatt while the lyrics are penned by Shakeel Azmi and Junaid Wasi.

Track listing

References

External links

2011 films
2011 3D films
2010s Hindi-language films
2010s action horror films
2010s supernatural horror films
Indian action horror films
Indian supernatural horror films
Indian 3D films
Films directed by Vikram Bhatt
Films about time travel
Films set in country houses
2011 horror films